Jorge Daniel Graví Piñeiro (born 16 January 1994) is an Uruguayan footballer who plays for Plaza Colonia on loan from Cerro Largo as a right winger.

Club career
Born in Treinta y Tres, Graví finished his formation with Danubio, and was promoted to the main squad in 2014. He made his first team – and Primera División – debut on 15 February 2015, starting in a 1–0 away win against Racing Montevideo.

Graví scored his first goal for the club on 19 September 2015, netting the opener in a 1–1 home draw against Sud América. He would subsequently feature more regularly for the side in the following campaigns.

On 27 January 2018, Graví and fellow Danubio teammate Emiliano Ghan joined Córdoba CF on loan for six months, being immediately assigned to the reserves in Segunda División B.

On 29 January 2019, Graví was loaned out again, this time to Cerro Largo for the rest of 2019.

References

External links

1994 births
Living people
People from Treinta y Tres Department
Uruguayan footballers
Association football wingers
Uruguayan Primera División players
Segunda División B players
Danubio F.C. players
Cerro Largo F.C. players
Córdoba CF B players
Juventud de Las Piedras players
Club Plaza Colonia de Deportes players
Uruguayan expatriate footballers
Uruguayan expatriate sportspeople in Spain
Expatriate footballers in Spain